Attica Downtown Historic District is a national historic district located at Attica, Fountain County, Indiana. The district encompasses 50 contributing buildings in the central business district of Attica.  It developed between about 1840 and 1942, and includes notable examples of Art Deco, Gothic Revival, and Classical Revival style architecture.  Notable buildings include the U.S. Post Office (1935) designed by the Office of the Supervising Architect under Louis A. Simon, McDonald House (1840), Revere Hotel (1853), and I.O.O.F Building (c. 1870).

It was listed on the National Register of Historic Places in 1993.

References

Art Deco architecture in Indiana
Gothic Revival architecture in Indiana
Neoclassical architecture in Indiana
Historic districts in Fountain County, Indiana
National Register of Historic Places in Fountain County, Indiana
Historic districts on the National Register of Historic Places in Indiana